Forster is a coastal town in the Mid North Coast region of New South Wales, Australia, in the Mid-Coast Council LGA, about 308 km north-north-east of Sydney. It is immediately adjacent to its twin, Tuncurry, which is the smaller of the two towns. Forster is known for its stunning waters and Manning Valley beauty.

History 
Forster is named after William Forster, who also was the 4th Premier of New South Wales and who later served as Agent-General in London.
The first post office in Forster opened on 1 October 1872, with John Wyllie Breckenridge as postmaster at a salary of £10 a year.

The area was well known in the early days for its timber cutting and sawmills. Timber was collected from the lakes and rivers by the logpunts (droghers). 

A bridge over the Coolongolook River that marks the entrance to Wallis Lake was built in 1959 linking Forster and Tuncurry and replacing the punt service that had operated since 1890.

Demographics
According to the 2016 census of Population, there were 13,740 people in Forster.
 Aboriginal and Torres Strait Islander people made up 5.8% of the population. 
 82.0% of people were born in Australia. The next most common countries of birth were England 3.4% and New Zealand 1.1%.   
 89.8% of people spoke only English at home. 
 The most common responses for religion were Anglican 28.4%, No Religion 23.4% and Catholic 22.3%.

Tourism 

Because of its close proximity to Sydney, just under 4 hours drive, Forster-Tuncurry has established itself as a popular summer holiday destination; in the hotter months the population increases considerably. Due to this most of its shops and restaurants work on seasonal income, with some opening in the summer months exclusively.

The school holidays in the colder months also bring a considerable number of holidaymakers. Forster-Tuncurry is predominantly a family holiday location with large lakes and white sandy beaches. Notable nearby attractions the Bicentennial Trail, Cape Hawke, and Booti Booti National Park.

The most popular beaches are Forster Main Beach, Burgess Beach, and One Mile Beach, serviced by Forster and Cape Hawke Surf Lifesaving Clubs respectively. One Mile Beach, Pebbly Beach and Tuncurry Beach are popular with local surfers. Forster's ocean pool and the Tuncurry rock pool are very popular destinations for those with families.

Climate
Forster experiences a humid subtropical climate (Köppen: Cfa, Trewartha: Cfal/Cfbl); with warm summers and mild winters; and with a moderately high precipitation amount of 1,176.4 millimetres (47.99 in). The highest temperature recorded at Forster was 43.0 °C (109.4 °F) on 1 December 2004; the lowest recorded was 1.0 °C (33.8 °F) on 29 May 2019. On average, it has 124.5 clear days annually.

Clubs 
Forster has a range of sporting clubs in the area.
 Forster Bodyboarding Club 
 Cape Hawke Surf Club 
 Pacific Palms Surf Life Saving Club 
 Black Head Surf Life Saving Club
 Forster-Tuncurry Hawks Rugby League Club
 Great Lakes United Football Club

Notable people
Courtney Houssos – New South Wales politician
Jamal Idris – former rugby league player
Ben Jeffries – former rugby league player
Adam Pearce – football player
Scott Hill – rugby league player
Luke Ricketson – former rugby league player was born in Forster before moving to Sydney as a young child
Jack River (musician)

References

External links

 Forster-Tuncurry Visitor Guide – www.Forster.com.au

Towns in the Hunter Region
Suburbs of Mid-Coast Council
Fishing communities in Australia
Coastal towns in New South Wales
Seaside resorts in Australia